Tommy Rifka Putra (born June 26, 1984 in Padang Panjang, West Sumatra), is an Indonesian footballer who plays as a defender for Semen Padang.

Statistics 
As of 14 May 2012.

References 

1984 births
Indonesian footballers
Living people
Semen Padang F.C. players
People from Padang Panjang
Association football defenders
Sportspeople from West Sumatra